Kalateh-ye Molla Mohammad (also Romanized as Kalāteh-ye Mollā Moḩammad and Kalāteh Mollā Mohammad; also known as Mollā Maḩmūd, Mollā Moḩammad, Mulla Muhammad, and Tāzākand) is a village in Dowlatkhaneh Rural District, Bajgiran District, Quchan County, Razavi Khorasan Province, Iran. At the 2006 census, its population was 205, in 49 families.

References 

Populated places in Quchan County